There are two radio telescopes designated RT-64 (TNA-1500), both in Russia and with similar specifications.

With their 64m antenna diameter, they are among the largest radio telescopes in the world.

They are:
 the Bear Lakes RT-64 radio telescope at the Bear Lakes Satellite Communications Center, in Bear Lakes, Shchyolkovo, near Moscow.
 the Kalyazin RT-64 radio telescope at the Kalyazin Radio Astronomy Observatory, Kalyazin, Russia

See also 
 RT-70, a larger aperture Russian design.

References

External links 
 Bear Lakes Radio Astronomy Station
 The Soviet/Russian Deep Space Network
 Russian Ground Control Stations
 Don P. Mitchel. Soviet Telemetry Systems. Deep-Space Communication Centers

Radio telescopes
Soviet inventions